The Lost Letter (Propavshaya gramota), or A Disappeared Diploma, is a 1945 Soviet animated film directed by the "grandmothers of the Russian animation", Brumberg sisters, and Lamis Bredis. It is the first Soviet traditionally-animated feature film.  It was produced at the Soyuzmultfilm studio in Moscow and is based on the 1832 story with the same name by Nikolai Gogol. The creators of the film managed to convey national Ukrainian color and to recreate the magical, fantastic atmosphere peculiar to works of the writer. Also, for a more realistic style of dance in the Zaporozhets and the Cossack, Igor Moiseyev was involved.

Plot
On a hot August day, a messenger sends the Cossack to the capital with the diploma, meant for the queen, tucked away under his hat. On the road he strikes up an acquaintanceship with a loose Zaporozhet. During a break in their journey, the new friend told the Cossack that he sold his soul to a devil and waits for payment. At night the Cossack didn't go to bed, deciding to take the role of lookout. As the night darkened, the place they rested grew progressively as the devil came, took away the cossack's horse, and the queen's diploma with her. It was necessary to look for to the devil in order to retrieve the Cossack's items, but the devil was lost in the wood, Furthermore, it became clear that these woods were overflowing with evil spirits. Soon the Cossack found himself in the presence of many minor devil spirits and the evil witch-like entity who was controlling them. He challenged her to a card game in order to get his horse and the queen's diploma back. Despite the queen's cheating, he caught her and beat her, winning in the end, being able to leave with all of his things. In the morning the Cossack said goodbye to the acquaintance and, without further stops, rushed off to St. Petersburg.

Creators

Video
In the mid-nineties, Studio PRO Video (together with the best Soviet animated films) and the Soyuz studio let out videotapes with this animated film.

In the 2000s, the animated film is released on DVD by Soyuz studio.

See also
 Propala Hramota
 The Lost Letter: A Tale Told by the Sexton of the N...Church
 History of Russian animation
 List of animated feature films
 The Humpbacked Horse (1947 film) - the second cel-animated Soviet feature film

External links

  (Russian)
Propavshaya gramota at the Animator.ru (English and Russian)
Review of the film at Anipages Daily
Propavshaya gramota at myltik.ru 

1945 animated films
1945 films
Films based on works by Nikolai Gogol
Films directed by the Brumberg sisters
Soviet animated films
1940s Russian-language films
Soyuzmultfilm